David Marrero and Fernando Verdasco were the defending champions but Verdasco decided not to participate.
Marrero successfully defended the title alongside Łukasz Kubot, defeating Simone Bolelli and Fabio Fognini in the final, 7–5, 6–2.

Seeds

Draw

Draw

References
 Main Draw

2013 Abierto Mexicano Telcel